Rádio Record is a Brazilian radio station based in São Paulo, Brazil. It is part of the Grupo Record and operates in the frequency 1000 kHz AM. It has programming dedicated to sports, news, and popular programs.

History
Rádio Record was founded in 1928 by Álvaro Liberato de Macedo, with the name of Rádio Sociedade Record, and passed to Paulo Machado de Carvalho in 1931.

In 1932, it became famous thanks to the covering of transmission of the Constitutionalist Revolution of 1932.

After that, the Rádio Record started to transmit music shows with famous artists and singers. Its leadership in 30 years passed to be shared with the Rádio Nacional.

At the end of the 80s on Rádio Record sold to the businessman Edir Macedo.

See also 
 Rede Record

External links
 

Radio stations in Brazil
Radio stations established in 1928
Mass media in São Paulo
Grupo Record